Mount Pleasant Regional Airport , also known as Faison Field, is a public airport located  northeast of the central business district of Mount Pleasant, a town in Charleston County, South Carolina, United States. It is owned by the Charleston County Aviation Authority. It was formerly the East Cooper Airport.

Although most U.S. airports use the same three-letter location identifier for the FAA and IATA, this airport is assigned LRO by the FAA but has no designation from the IATA.

Facilities and Aircraft 

For the 12-month period ending November 15, 2019, the airport had 18,250 aircraft operations, an average of 50 per day: 94% general aviation, 5% air taxi and 1% military. There are 54 aircraft based at this airport: 94% single engine and 6% multi-engine.

References

External links 
 
 

Airports in South Carolina
Buildings and structures in Charleston County, South Carolina
Transportation in Charleston County, South Carolina
Mount Pleasant, South Carolina